Fendt Caravan GmbH is a German manufacturer of travel trailers (caravans) and recreational vehicles; its headquarters is located in Mertingen. It was formerly a part of the Fendt company. Fendt Caravan was sold in the late 1990s when the AGCO Corporation purchased Fendt, and is now part of the Hobby-Wohnwagenwerk.

References

Recreational vehicle manufacturers
Caravan and travel trailer manufacturers